"Promised Land" is a song lyric written by Chuck Berry to the melody of "Wabash Cannonball", an American folk song. The song was first recorded in this version by Berry in 1964 for his album St. Louis to Liverpool. Released in December 1964, it was Berry's first single issued following his prison term for a Mann Act conviction. The record peaked at #41 in the Billboard charts on January 16, 1965.

Background
Berry wrote the song while in prison, and borrowed an atlas from the prison library to plot the itinerary. In the lyrics, the singer (who refers to himself as "the poor boy") tells of his journey from Norfolk, Virginia, to the "Promised Land", Los Angeles, California, mentioning various cities in Southern states that he passes through on his journey. Describing himself as a "poor boy," the protagonist boards a Greyhound bus in Norfolk, Virginia that passes Raleigh, N.C., stops in Charlotte, North Carolina, and bypasses Rock Hill, South Carolina.  The bus rolls out of Atlanta but breaks down, leaving him stranded in downtown Birmingham, Alabama. He then takes a train "across Mississippi clean" to New Orleans.  From there, he goes to Houston, where "the people there who care a bit about me" buy him a silk suit, luggage and a plane ticket to Los Angeles. Upon landing in Los Angeles, he calls Norfolk, Virginia ("Tidewater four, ten-oh-nine") to tell the folks back home he made it to the "promised land." The lyric: "Swing low sweet chariot, come down easy/Taxi to the terminal zone" refers to the gospel lyric: "Swing low sweet Chariot, coming for to carry me Home" since both refer to a common destination, "The Promised Land," which in this case is California, reportedly a heaven on earth.

Billboard called the song a "true blue Berry rocker with plenty of get up and go," adding that "rinky piano and wailing Berry electric guitar fills all in neatly."  Cash Box described it as "a 'pull-out-all-the-stops' rocker that Chuck pounds out solid sales authority" and "a real mover that should head out for hit territory in no time flat." In 2021, it was listed at No. 342 on Rolling Stone's "Top 500 Greatest Songs of All Time".

Chart history

Elvis Presley version

In December 1973, Elvis Presley recorded a powerful, driving version. Presley's version of "Promised Land" was released as a single on September 27, 1974. It peaked at number 14 on the Hot 100  Billboard charts, and 9 on the UK Singles Chart in the fall of 1974. It was included on his 1975 album Promised Land. The Presley version was used in the soundtrack of the 1997 motion picture Men in Black.

Chart history

Personnel
 Elvis Presley – lead vocals, harmony vocals 
 James Burton – lead guitar
 Johnny Christopher — rhythm guitar
 Charlie Hodge – acoustic rhythm guitar
 Norbert Putnam – bass
 David Briggs – piano or organ; overdubbed tambourine
 Per Eric “Pete” Hallin – clavinet
 Ronnie Tutt – drums
 Randy Cullers – overdubbed cowbell

Other versions
There are numerous other versions of this song:
In 1964 Johnny Rivers released his live album In Action including this song..
The Grateful Dead have notably, performed the song live 425 times from July 1971 through the band's last show in 1995; live performances appear on nearly 50 of the band's live albums, including the 1976 United Artists released live album Steal Your Face as well as several of the band's Dick's Picks releases. 
 In 1970 Freddy Weller released a version on an album of the same name.  It was a Top 5 country hit in the winter of 1971.
 In 1971 Johnnie Allan released a Cajun version in the US. It was released in 1974 in the UK. 
 In 1971 Dave Edmunds included it on his album Rockpile, released also as a single in 1972, it reached number 5 in the Australian charts.
 In 1972 the band Juicy Lucy recorded a version on their album Pieces.
 In 1973 the Canadian-American rock group The Band recorded "Promised Land" for their sixth studio LP, Moondog Matinee. 
 In 1974 James Taylor recorded a version on his album Walking Man.
 In 1977 it was recorded by country singer Billy "Crash" Craddock on his album Live!.
 In 1983 Meat Loaf recorded the song for his Midnight at the Lost and Found album.
 In 1984 The Black Sorrows recorded a version for their debut studio album, Sonola.
 In 1984 Mike Read released a cover version but set in and near London. The song was mentioned in the documentary Embarrassing 80s.
 In 2007 Geno Delafose released a zydeco version on his album Le Cowboy Creole.
 In 2009 W.A.S.P. recorded a version of this song on the album Babylon.
 In 2014 Harry Dean Stanton released a version on the soundtrack album for the documentary film about him, Partly Fiction.
 In 2014 Jerry Lee Lewis released a version of this song on his album Rock & Roll Time

Johnny Hallyday version (in French)

The song was covered in French by Johnny Hallyday, using an adaptation of Presley's arrangement. His version (titled "La Terre promise") was released in 1975 and spent one week at no. 1 on the singles sales chart in France (from November 1 to 7, 1975).

Charts

References

1964 songs
1965 singles
1974 singles
1975 singles
Chess Records singles
RCA Records singles
Elvis Presley songs
Bill Haley songs
Freddy Weller songs
Grateful Dead songs
Billy "Crash" Craddock songs
Dave Edmunds songs
Johnny Hallyday songs
Songs written by Chuck Berry
Works about human migration
Number-one singles in France